Piyush is a given name. Notable people with the name include:
Piyush Chawla (born 1988), Indian cricketer
Piyush Goyal (born 1964), Indian politician
Piyush "Bobby" Jindal (born 1971), American politician
Piyush Jha Indian author, film director and screenwriter
Piyush Mishra (born 1963), Indian film and theatre actor, music director, lyricist, singer, scriptwriter
Piyush Trivedi (born 1958), Indian academician and educationist